The Northlander is a 2016 Canadian fantasy adventure film written and directed by Benjamin Ross Hayden. The film stars Corey Sevier as Cygnus, Roseanne Supernault as Mari, and Michelle Thrush as Nova. The film was produced by Benjamin Ross Hayden's production company Manifold Pictures and filmed in Alberta.

The film premiered at the 40th Montreal World Film Festival. The film was selected in the Perspective Canada program at Cannes in 2016. It was distributed under the banner Raven Banner Entertainment theatrically in Canada. The Northlander was lauded as one among "8 of indigenous cinema's most important films" by i-D magazine. The Northlander theatrically opened in over ten major cities across Canada between October 2016 and April 2017.

The Northlander won Best Screenplay Award at the 40th Alberta Film & Television Awards, and for directing the film Hayden was awarded the RBC Artist Award at the Mayor's Lunch for Arts Champions.

Plot
In the year 2961, the time is after humanity and nature have recovered the land. A hunter named Cygnus is called to protect his people. He travels across a desert valley to protect his tribe against a band of Heretics and must find a way for his tribe to survive.

The story is inspired by the historic journey of the Métis leader Louis Riel away from Batoche, Saskatchewan toward the Montana mountains in the 1880s.

The film's futuristic styling of Canadian history has the film contributing to the science fiction movements of Indigenous Futurism.

Cast
 Corey Sevier as Cygnus
 Roseanne Supernault as Mari
 Michelle Thrush as Nova
 Nathaniel Arcand
 Julian Black Antelope

Accolades

See also
 List of Canadian films of 2016

References

External links
 
 Production website

Canadian fantasy adventure films
2010s fantasy adventure films
2010s English-language films
2010s Canadian films